Plocama rosea, is a species of flowering plant in the family Rubiaceae. It is native to Iran, Afghanistan, and Pakistan.  It was formerly recognized as Aitchisonia rosea, which was the only species in the now synonymized genus Aitchisonia.

References

rosea
Plants described in 1882
Taxa named by William Hemsley (botanist)
Taxa named by James Edward Tierney Aitchison